Sean Russell (born 27 May 2002) is an Australian professional rugby league footballer who plays as a er or  for the Parramatta Eels in the NRL.

Background
Russell was born in Windsor, New South Wales, Australia.

He played his junior rugby league for the Rouse Hill Rhinos. Russell played fullback for Patrician Brothers Blacktown in their NRL Schoolboy final, scoring a try, playing alongside fellow Eels teammates Jakob Arthur and Samuel Loizou.

Playing career

2021
In round 15 of the 2021 NRL season, Russell made his first grade debut for Parramatta against the Canterbury-Bankstown Bulldogs, scoring two tries in a 36-10 victory.
In December 2021, Russell signed a new deal to remain at Parramatta until the end of the 2023 season.

2022
In round 1 of the 2022 NRL season, Russell scored a hat-trick in Parramatta's 32-28 victory over the Gold Coast, however suffered fractured ribs and a punctured lung as he scored his third try following an ugly collision with Jayden Campbell. Russell was taken to hospital in the aftermath and later ruled out indefinitely from playing.
On 7 October, Russell signed a two-year contract extension to remain at Parramatta until the end of 2024.

2023
On 15 March, it was announced that Russell would miss the entire 2023 season after he injured his shoulder during a freak training accident which would require surgery.

References

External links
Parramatta Eels profile
Round 15 team list
Russell scores double on debut
Rugby league project

2002 births
Living people
Australian rugby league players
Parramatta Eels players
Rugby league players from Windsor, New South Wales
Rugby league wingers